Henry Clifford (by 1513 – 1577) was an English politician.

He was a Member (MP) of the Parliament of England for Salisbury in 1547 and for Great Bedwyn in 1555 and 1559.

References

1577 deaths
English MPs 1547–1552
English MPs 1555
English MPs 1559
Year of birth uncertain